Florian Pinteaux (born 4 February 1992) is a French professional footballer who plays as a full-back for Championnat National 2 club Beauvais.

Club career
Born in Creil, Pinteaux began his youth career playing for Monaco. He signed a professional contract with Monaco in 2011 and made his first appearance in December 2011.

His performance with the reserve team was excellent and he signed his first professional contract in March 2010.  He made his first appearance with the first team during the Ligue 2 match against Le Havre. The team played out for a 2–2 draw.

He joined Arles-Avignon in January 2015.

Career statistics
.

References

External links
 
 
 
 

1992 births
Living people
People from Creil
Sportspeople from Oise
French footballers
Association football defenders
AS Monaco FC players
CS Sedan Ardennes players
Le Havre AC players
AC Arlésien players
LB Châteauroux players
Sparta Rotterdam players
FC Chambly Oise players
AS Beauvais Oise players
Championnat National 2 players
Ligue 2 players
Championnat National 3 players
Championnat National players
Eredivisie players
Tweede Divisie players
French expatriate footballers
Expatriate footballers in the Netherlands
French expatriate sportspeople in the Netherlands
Footballers from Hauts-de-France